Glamour photography is a genre of photography in which the subjects are portrayed in erotic poses ranging from fully clothed to nude. The term may be a euphemism for erotic photography. For glamour models, body shape and size are directly related to success.

This type of photography is known as "cheesecake" or "pin-up" for women and "beefcake" for men.

Since glamour photography can include nudity, the distinction between this and softcore pornography is largely a matter of taste, although depictions of sexual contact are not considered within this genre and an important differentiator between it and pornography. Glamour photography is generally a composed image of a subject in a still position. The subjects of glamour photography for professional use are often professional models, and the photographs are normally intended for commercial use, including mass-produced calendars, pinups and men's magazines such as Maxim; but amateur subjects are also sometimes used, and sometimes the photographs are intended for private and personal use only. Photographers use a combination of cosmetics, lighting and airbrushing techniques to produce an appealing image of the subject.

History

Until the later half of the 20th century glamour photography was usually referred to as erotic photography. Early erotic photography was often associated with "French postcards", small postcard sized images, that were sold by street vendors in France. In the early 1900s the pinup became popular and depicted scantily dressed women, often in a playful pose, seemingly surprised or startled by the viewer. The subject would usually have an expression of delight which seemed to invite the viewer to come and play. During World War II pin-up pictures of scantily clad movie stars were extremely popular among American servicemen. Betty Grable was one of the most famous pin-up models of all time; her pinup in a bathing suit was extremely popular with World War II soldiers.

In December 1953, Marilyn Monroe was featured in the first issue of Playboy magazine. Bettie Page was the Playboy Playmate of the Month in January 1955. Playboy was the first magazine featuring nude erotic photography to receive mainstream attention. Penthouse was the second such magazine to achieve this.

Glamour models popular in the early 1990s included Hope Talmons and Dita Von Teese and the modern era is represented in the U.S. by models like Heidi Van Horne and Bernie Dexter, while leading representatives of the genre in the UK include Katie Price and Lucy Pinder.

Magazines and movie stars
Standards and styles of glamour photography change over time, reflecting for example changes in social acceptance and taste. In the early 1920s, United States photographers like Ruth Harriet Louise and George Hurrell photographed celebrities to glamorize their stature by utilizing lighting techniques to develop dramatic effects.

Until the 1950s, glamour photography in advertising and in men's magazines was highly controversial or even illegal. In some countries, if not illegal, such magazines could not be on public display, and some had to be displayed in a plastic cover. Magazines featuring glamour photography were sometimes marketed as "art magazines" or "health magazines".

Popular portraiture

Since the 1990s and especially in the 2010s, glamour photography has increased in popularity among the public. In more formal settings, glamour portrait studios have opened, offering professional hair and makeup artists and professional retouching to allow the general public to have the "model" experience. These sometimes include boudoir portraits but are more commonly used by professionals and high school seniors who want to look their best for their portraits. As photography has become widely adopted through the use of smartphones, glamour photography has become a popular type of content featured on social media, particularly on Instagram. Instagram models and influencers posting glamour photography-type content have attracted heavy scrutiny from the general public, and are blamed for contributing to rising rates of depression and anxiety in the West.

Gallery

See also

 Erotic photography model
 Fashion photography
 Gravure model
 List of glamour models

Further reading

References

Glamour models
Erotic photography
Photography by genre